This list of Scottish actors is part of the List of Scots series.

A
Khalid Abdalla (born 1980)
Andrew Agnew (born 1976)
Sadie Aitken (1905–1985)
Spottiswoode Aitken (1868–1933)
Maev Alexander (born 1948)
John Alford (born 1971)
Andrea Allan (born 1946)
Charlie Allan (born 1963)
Ronni Ancona (born 1966)
Dave Anderson (born 1945)
Rona Anderson (1926–2013)
David Ashton (born 1941)

B
Shabana Bakhsh (born 1981)
Ian Bannen (1928–1999)
Lois de Banzie (1930–2021)
John Barrowman (born 1967)
Stanley Baxter (born 1926)
Johnny Beattie (1926–2020)
Maureen Beattie (born 1953)
Duncan Bell (born 1955)
John Bell (born 1997)
Margaret Bicknell (1681–1723)
Sean Biggerstaff (born 1983)
Isobel Black (born 1943)
Peter Blake (1948–2018)
Martin Boddey (1907–1975)
Mark Bonnar (born 1968)
Stuart Bowman
Billy Boyd (born 1968)
Kate Bracken (born 1990)
Joseph Brady (1928–2001)
Steven Brand (born 1969)
Paul Brannigan (born 1986)
Ewen Bremner (born 1972)
Rory Bremner (born 1961)
Edmund Breon (1882–1951)
Laurie Brett (born 1969)
Janet Brown (1923–2011)
Katrina Bryan (born 1980)
Colin Buchanan (born 1966)
Ian Buchanan (born 1957)
Jack Buchanan (1891–1957)
Robert Buchanan (born 1962)
Tam Dean Burn (born 1958)
Gerard Butler (born 1969)

C
Jean Cadell (1884–1967)
Juliet Cadzow (born 1951)
John Cairney (born 1930)
Ian Cairns (born 1963)
Ricky Callan (1962–2016)
Dayton Callie (born 1956)
Gianni Capaldi (born 1975)
Peter Capaldi (born 1958)
Victor Carin (1932–1981)
Robert Carlyle (born 1961)
Walter Carr (1925–1998)
Helena Carroll (1928–2013)
Michael Carter (born 1947)
Robert Cavanah (born 1965)
Ian Charleson (1949–1990)
Morven Christie (born 1981)
Hamish Clark (born 1965)
Jameson Clark (1907–1984)
Sophie Kennedy Clark (born 1990)
Scott Cleverdon (born 1969)
Andy Clyde (1892–1967)
Robbie Coltrane (1950–2022)
Martin Compston (born 1984)
Ruth Connell  (born 1979)
Neil Connery (1938–2021)
Sir Sean Connery (1930–2020)
Billy Connolly (born 1942)
Tom Conti (born 1941)
James Copeland (1918–2002)
Kate Copstick (born 1956)
Kari Corbett (born 1984)
Ronnie Corbett (1930–2016)
Adrienne Corri (1930–2016)
Paul-James Corrigan
James Cosmo (born 1948)
Brian Cox (born 1946)
Mark Cox (born 1972)
Alec Craig (1884–1945)
Kenneth Cranham (born 1944)
Annette Crosbie (born 1934)
Graham Crowden (1922–2010)
Sara Crowe (born 1966)
Andrew Cruickshank (1907–1988)
Eric Cullen (1965–1996)
Alan Cumming (born 1965)
Fiona Cumming (1937–2015)
Tony Curran (born 1969)
Finlay Currie (1878–1968)
Henry Ian Cusick (born 1967)
Iain Cuthbertson (1930–2009)
Ivor Cutler (1923–2006)

D
Jake D'Arcy (1945–2015)
Benjamin Davies (born 1980)
Anthony Dawson (1916–1992)
Michael Deacon (1933–2000)
Iain De Caestecker (born 1987)
Kate Dickie (born 1971)
Jack Docherty (born 1962)
Fiona Dolman (born 1970)
Ron Donachie (born 1956)
James Donald (1917–1993)
Donald Douglas (born 1933)
Blythe Duff (born 1962)
Duncan Duff (born 1964)
Karen Dunbar (born 1971)
Archie Duncan (1914–1979)
Lindsay Duncan (born 1950)
Michelle Duncan (born 1978)
William Dysart (1929–2002)

E
Valerie Edmond (born 1969)
Zoë Eeles (born 1975)
David Elliot (born 1981)
Emun Elliott (born 1983)
Kieron Elliott
Suzy Enoch

F
Andrew Fairlie (born 1963)
Kellyanne Farquhar
Craig Ferguson (born 1962)
Lynn Ferguson (born 1965)
Alex Ferns (born 1968)
Jimmy Finlayson (1887–1953)
Gregor Fisher (born 1953)
Isla Fisher (born 1976)
Jeannie Fisher (born 1947)
Lesley Fitz-Simons (1961–2013)
Tommy Flanagan (born 1965)
Susan Fleetwood (1944–1995)
Tom Fleming (1927–2010)
Ryan Fletcher (born 1982)
Peter Forbes (born 1960)
Carl Forgione (1944–1998)
Brigit Forsyth (born 1940)
Polly Frame (born 1976)
Alan Francis (born 1967)
Bill Fraser (1908–1987)
John Fraser (1931–2020)
Laura Fraser (born 1976)
Peter Fraser
Colin Friels (born 1952)
Rikki Fulton (1924–2004)
Robert Fyfe (1930–2021)

G
John Gaffney
Patricia Gage (1940–2010)
Frank Gallagher (actor) (born 1962)
David Gant (born 1943)
Graeme Garden (born 1943)
James Gillan (born 1975)
Karen Gillan (born 1987)
William Gillespie (1894–1938)
Iain Glen (born 1961)
Helena Gloag (1909–1973)
Isabella Glyn (1823–1889)
Janey Godley (born 1961)
Valerie Gogan
Michelle Gomez (born 1966)
Stella Gonet (born 1963)
Claire Goose (born 1975)
Hannah Gordon (born 1941)
Mary Gordon (1882–1963)
Colin Graham (1931–2007)
Julie Graham (born 1965)
Morland Graham (1891–1949)
Andy Gray (1959–2021)
Elspet Gray (1929–2013)
Frances Grey (born 1970)
John Grieve (1924–2003)
Ian Grieve (born 1965)
Clare Grogan (born 1962)
Sorcha Groundsell (born 1998)
Pippa Guard (born 1952)

H
Kasia Haddad (born 1979)
Gay Hamilton (born 1943)
Prentis Hancock (born 1942)
John Hannah (born 1962)
Billy Hartman (born 1957)
David Hayman (born 1948)
Daniel Healy (born 1986)
Matt Healy (born 1970)
Lorna Heilbron (born 1948)
Vivien Heilbron (born 1944)
Greg Hemphill (born 1969)
Betty Henderson (1907–1979)
Shirley Henderson (born 1965)
Rae Hendrie (born 1977)
Douglas Henshall (born 1965)
Dee Hepburn (born 1961)
Eileen Herlie (1918–2008)
Sam Heughan (born 1980)
Pat Heywood (born 1931)
Paul Higgins (born 1964)
Gary Hollywood (born 1979)
Morag Hood (1942–2002)
Ewan Hooper (born 1935)
Renée Houston (1902–1980)
Russell Hunter (1925–2004)
Ken Hutchison (1948–2021)
Olaf Hytten (1888–1955)

I
Armando Iannucci (born 1964)
Frieda Inescort (1901–1976)
Millie Innes (born 2000)
Kenny Ireland (1945–2014)
Paul Ireland (born 1970)

J
Gordon Jackson (1923–1990)
Duncan Airlie James (born 1961)
Robert James (1924–2004)
Ashley Jensen (born 1968)
Jayd Johnson (born 1990)
Kaiya Jones (born 1996)

K
John Kane (born 1945)
Sean Kane (born 1969)
Stan Kane (1929–2015)
Marysia Kay (born 1975)
Jenni Keenan-Green
Andrew Keir (1926–1997)
Gerard Kelly (1959–2010)
Ryan Kelly 
Moultrie Kelsall (1901–1980)
Fiona Kennedy
Gordon Kennedy (born 1958)
Deborah Kerr (1921–2007)
Ford Kiernan (born 1962)
Georgia King (born 1986)
Kananu Kirimi (born 1977)
Scott Kyle (born 1983)

L
Simon Lack (1913–1980)
Simone Lahbib (born 1965)
Robin Laing (born 1976)
Declan Michael Laird (born 1993)
Jack Lambert (1899–1976)
David Langton (1912–1994)
Bryan Larkin (born 1973)
John Laurie (1897–1980)
Phyllida Law (born 1932)
Denis Lawson (born 1947)
Benny Lee (1916–1995)
Jane Lee (1912–1957)
Angus Lennie (1930–2014)
Gerald Lepkowski
Rose Leslie (born 1987)
Katie Leung (born 1987)
Gary Lewis (born 1957)
Ashley Lilley (born 1986)
Debbie Linden (1961–1997)
Crawford Logan
Ella Logan (1913–1969)
Phyllis Logan (born 1956)
Jack Lowden (born 1990)
Lulu (born 1948)
 Lauren Lyle (born 1993)

M
Cal MacAninch (born 1963)
Edith MacArthur (1926–2018)
Aimi MacDonald (born 1942)
Kelly Macdonald (born 1976)
Shauna Macdonald (born 1981)
Angus Macfadyen (born 1963)
Mirren Mack (born 1997)
Fulton Mackay (1922–1987)
Alastair Mackenzie (born 1970)
Alex Mackenzie (1885–1965)
James Mackenzie (born 1979)
Lewis MacLeod (born 1970)
David Macmillan (born 1935)
Alan MacNaughtan (1920–2002)
Ian MacNaughton (1925–2002)
James MacPherson (born 1960)
Duncan Macrae (1905–1967)
Leah MacRae
Richard Madden (born 1986)
Laura Main (born 1981)
Christopher Malcolm (1946–2014)
John Malcolm (1936–2008)
Margaret Mann (1868–1941)
Amy Manson (born 1985)
Shirley Manson (born 1966)
Chris Martin (born 1980)
James Martin (born 1931)
Forbes Masson (born 1963)
Hans Matheson (born 1975)
Freya Mavor (born 1993)
Lisa McAllister (born 1980)
Libby McArthur 
Alex McAvoy (1928–2005)
James McAvoy (born 1979)
Phil McCall (1925–2002)
Ross McCall (born 1976)
David McCallum (born 1933)
Eileen McCallum (born 1936)
Rory McCann (born 1969)
Brian McCardie (born 1965)
Jane McCarry (born 1970)
Stephen McCole
Billy McColl (1951–2014)
Iain McColl (1954–2013)
Gordon McCorkell (born 1983)
Sylvester McCoy (born 1943)
Colin McCredie (born 1972)
Alex McCrindle (1911–1990)
Andrew McCulloch (born 1945)
Ian McCulloch (born 1939)
Kathleen McDermott (born 1977)
Ian McDiarmid (born 1944)
Jack McElhone (born 1994)
Joe McFadden (born 1975)
Graeme McGeagh
Paul McGillion (born 1969)
John McGlynn (born 1953)
Ewan McGregor (born 1971)
Stuart McGugan (born 1944)
Greg McHugh (born 1980)
Neve McIntosh (born 1972)
David McKay
James McKenna (born 1953)
Allison McKenzie (born 1979)
Lindsay McKenzie (born 1985)
Kevin McKidd (born 1973)
Norman McKinnel (1870–1932)
Stewart McLean (1941–2006)
Una McLean (born 1930)
Roddy McMillan (1923–1979)
Steven McNicoll
Neil McNulty (born 1985)
Hilton McRae (born 1949)
Peter McRobbie (born 1943)
Graham McTavish (born 1961)
Raymond Mearns
Donald Meek (1878–1946)
Ruth Millar (born 1975)
Steven Miller (born 1982)
Gavin Mitchell (born 1966)
Kirsty Mitchell (born 1974)
Colin Mochrie (born 1957)
Henry Mollison (1905–1985)
Alec Monteath (1941–2021)
Campbell Morrison (1952–2008)
Jon Morrison
Alexander Morton (born 1945)
Euan Morton (born 1977)
Ashley Mulheron (born 1986)
Tiffany Mulheron (born 1984)
Peter Mullan (born 1959)
Alex Munro (1911–1986)
Katy Murphy (born 1963)

N
Daniela Nardini (born 1968)
Michael Nardone (born 1966)
Alec Newman (born 1974)
Hector Nicol (1920–1985)
Claire Nielson (born 1937)
Alex Norton (born 1950)

O
Gray O'Brien (born 1968)
David O'Hara (born 1965)
Colette O'Neil (1935–2021)
Tony Osoba (born 1947)

P
David Paisley (born 1979)
John Paisley (born 1938)
Marianna Palka (born 1981)
Ray Park (born 1974)
Bill Paterson (born 1945)
Caroline Paterson (born 1965)
Dorothy Paul (born 1937)
Eve Pearce (born 1929)
Alison Peebles (born 1956)
Hay Petrie (1895–1948)
Carmen Pieraccini (born 1979)
Jacqueline Pirie (born 1975)
Daniel Portman (born 1992)
Duncan Pow (born 1980)
Mark Prendergast (born 1983)

R
Ashly Rae
Barbara Rafferty (born 1954)
Cecil Ramage (1895–1988)
Richard Rankin (born 1983)
Siobhan Redmond (born 1959)
Gordon Reid (1939–2003)
Sally Reid (born 1982)
Sheila Reid (born 1937)
Enn Reitel (born 1950)
Ralph Riach (1936–2022)
Ian Richardson (1934–2007)
Derek Riddell (born 1967)
Mary Riggans (1935–2013)
Paul Riley (born 1962)
David Rintoul (born 1948)
Heather Ripley (born 1959)
Natalie J. Robb (born 1974)
Andrew Robertson (born 1941)
Iain Robertson (born 1981)
Robert Robertson (1930–2001)
Sam Robertson (born 1985)
Steven Robertson (born 1980)
Michael E. Rodgers (born 1969)
Maurice Roëves (1937–2020)
Sharon Rooney (born 1988)
Tony Roper (born 1941)
George Rossi (born 1960)
William Ruane (born 1985)
Laurance Rudic (born 1952)
Clive Russell (born 1945)

S
Dougray Scott (born 1965)
Elizabeth Sellars (1921–2019)
John Sessions (1953–2020)
Michael Sheard (1938–2005)
Moira Shearer (1926–2006)
Alastair Sim (1900–1976)
Bill Simpson (1931–1986)
Adam Sinclair (born 1977)
John Gordon Sinclair (born 1962)
Marli Siu (born 1993)
Sharon Small (born 1967)
James Smillie (born 1944)
Elaine C. Smith (born 1958)
Milind Soman (born 1965)
Henry Stamper (1937–2009)
Dawn Steele (born 1975)
Gerda Stevenson (born 1956)
Ewan Stewart (born 1959)
Jeff Stewart (born 1955)
Sara Stewart (born 1966)
Ken Stott (born 1954)
Kirsty Strain (born 1980)
Melissa Stribling (1927–1992)
John Stuart (1898–1979)
Irene Sunters (1928–2005)
Maureen Swanson (1932–2011)
Jim Sweeney (born 1956)
Tilda Swinton (born 1960)

T
Arthur Taxier (born 1951)
Paul Telfer (born 1979)
David Tennant (born 1971)
Jack Thibeau (born 1946)
Emma Thompson (born 1959)
Sophie Thompson (born 1962)
David Torrence (1864–1951)
Ernest Torrence (1878–1933)
Kay Tremblay (1914–2005)

U
Gudrun Ure (born 1926)
Mary Ure (1933–1975)
Tom Urie (born 1969)
Molly Urquhart (1906–1977)
Robert Urquhart (1921–1995)

V
 Steve Valentine (born 1966)
 Joanna Vanderham (born 1990)
 Sandra Voe (born 1936)

W
Dave Ward (born 1957)
Keith Warwick (born 1975)
Russell Waters (1908–1982)
James Watson (born 1970)
Jonathan Watson (born 1956)
Tom Watson (1932–2001)
Molly Weir (1910–2004)
Simon Weir (born 1973)
Karen Westwood
Tam White (1942–2010)
Jon Whiteley (1945–2020)
Nicol Williamson (1936–2011)
Hamish Wilson (1942–2020)
Richard Wilson (born 1936)
Julie Wilson Nimmo (born 1972)
Vincent Winter (1947–1998)
Madeleine Worrall (born 1977)

Y
Atta Yaqub (born 1979)
Benny Young (born 1949)
John Young (1916–1996)
Paul Young (born 1944)
Jimmy Yuill (born 1956)
Joe Yule (1892–1950)

References

 
Actors
Scottish